Jean François Graindorge (1 July 1770 – 1 October 1810) became a brigade commander during the Napoleonic Wars and was mortally wounded while leading his troops against the British at the Battle of Bussaco in Portugal. His surname is one of the names inscribed under the Arc de Triomphe, on Column 38.

Career
On 1 July 1770 Graindorge was born at Saint-Pois in the province of Normandy in France. He joined the French army on 20 September 1791 as a lieutenant of the 1st Orne Volunteer Battalion. This unit soon became part of the 37th Line Infantry Demi-Brigade and fought with the Army of the North in 1792 and 1793. Graindorge was wounded by a bullet in the right thigh near Maubeuge on 11 June 1792.

Notes

References

 

Generals of the First French Empire
French military personnel of the French Revolutionary Wars
French military personnel killed in the Napoleonic Wars
French commanders of the Napoleonic Wars
People from Manche
1770 births
1810 deaths
Names inscribed under the Arc de Triomphe